Krindlekrax is a thriller children's novel by author Philip Ridley. It was first published in 1991 by Jonathan Cape and republished in 1992 by Red Fox and then again in 2001 by Puffin Books where it is still in print.

The book won the Nestlé Smarties Book Prize in 1991 in the 9 – 11 age category. It was also selected by children aged 9 to 12 as the winner of the 1993 WH Smith Mind-Boggling Book Award.

The book became a Tellastory Audio Cassette in 1994 that was read by Rik Mayall.

In 2000, to celebrate the new millennium, Hachette Children's Group published Out of this world, a collection of extracts from "the best in 20th century children's literature". Krindlekrax was one of the books featured and appeared alongside such classics as Roald Dahl's Matilda and J.K. Rowling's Harry Potter and the Philosopher's Stone.

Ridley adapted Krindlekrax into a stage play, which premiered at Birmingham Repertory Theatre in 2002.

Plot
The story takes place in a street called Lizard Street, located in a town with cracked pavements, scorched brickwork and bumps and holes in the roads. It centres around a 9-year-old boy named Ruskin Splinter, who is small and thin with thick glasses, red frizzy hair, knock-knees and a squeaky voice. He wants to be the hero of a school play, but everyone criticises him for his appearance and voice, and the role is instead given to Ruskin's window-smashing former friend Elvis Cave. Ruskin's special friend is the local school caretaker, Corky Pigeon, who tells him his experiences with the evil monster that lurks in the sewers and terrorises the street, a giant fire breathing crocodile named Krindlekrax.

Later, Ruskin finds out from his drunken dad that everyone in Lizard Street was responsible for the monster getting into the sewers in the first place, and how it grew so big. Suddenly Corky unexpectedly dies, and everyone suspects it to be a heart attack, but Ruskin knows that Krindlekrax was responsible, and is angry with all of Lizard Street for allowing it to happen.

Ruskin is so upset with Corky's death that he can't get out of bed, but many people bring him gifts and tell him the story of how Corky got a gold medal (that he later gave to Ruskin as a present) for saving Lizard Street. After this, Ruskin decides to save the street from the wrath of Krindlekrax once and for all.

Later that night, Ruskin lures the monster out of the sewers, and tames it by throwing Corky's medal in its mouth, banishing it to the sewers forever.

After catching a terrible cold, Elvis can't do the play any more, so Ruskin takes his place and it all goes well, but Elvis isn't pleased and smashes all the windows in Lizard Street that he can in a tantrum. Ruskin stops Elvis' window smashing by bursting his ball and after a long talk, they become friends again.

The story ends with Ruskin saying how much he now loves his street.

Characters

Ruskin Splinter: The main character who may look small and dorky, but proves to be quite a hero.
Krindlekrax: The monster who lurks under the sewers of Lizard Street. It was once an infant crocodile but grew into a fierce fire breathing monster.
Wendy Splinter: Ruskin's mother who loves toast and tea and says "Polly Wolly Doodle all the Day!" when she gets flustered.
Winston Splinter: Ruskin's father, a fired zookeeper who is always complaining and saying "It's not my fault!" and "Don't interfere!"
Elvis Cave: The big and loud school bully who wears an American footballer's outfit and breaks windows (even when he sleepwalks), he was once Ruskin's friend but grew jealous of him when he became friends with Corky.
Sparkey Walnut: A timid boy who wears a baseball player's outfit. He was once Ruskin's friend but became Elvis' follower after he grew so tall and always said "Yes Sir!" to everything he said.
Corky Pigeon: An elderly man who was once a sewer maintenance man, but later became the caretaker at St George's school. He loved chocolate biscuits and shared a lot in common with Ruskin about plays.
Mr. Lace: The school teacher who enjoys sucking pencils and gets hysterical whenever William Shakespeare's name is mentioned.
Dr. Flowers: A man who always has his pockets full of tissues to help with his hay-fever, which causes him to sneeze at regular intervals.
Mr. Flick: A smart suited man who owns the cinema in Lizard Street.
Mrs. Walnut: Sparkey's mother who owns the greengrocers shop and always smells of potatoes.
Mr. and Mrs. Cave: Elvis' parents who own the Dragon and the Golden Penny pub and seem to do nothing about their son's window smashing.

Stage adaptation

Philip Ridley (himself an acclaimed playwright) adapted the novel into a stage play for children. The play premiered at Birmingham Rep, where it was performed from 20 – 29 June 2002. The production transferred to the Nottingham Playhouse where it played 4 – 20 July the same year.

Premiere

On 20 June 2002 at The Birmingham Repertory Theatre, Birmingham.Directed by Anthony Clark.

 Ruskin Splinter – Gregor Henderson-Begg
 Wendy Splinter – Maria Gough
 Winston Splinter – Jamie Newall
 Corky Pigeon – Alan Rothwell
 Elvis Cave – David Florez
 Mr Cave – Nick Stringer
 Mrs Cave – Joy Aldridge
 Sparkey Walnut – Sushil Chudasama
 Dr Flowers – John Flitcroft
 Mr Lace – David Kendall
 Mrs Walnut – Bharti Patel
 Mr Flick – Trevor Thomas

Publication of script

The script was published by Faber and Faber in 2002. However, the text became out of print due to Ridley leaving Faber and Faber in 2005 as a result of their refusal to publish his controversial stage play for adults Mercury Fur. Because of this Ridley then moved along with his back catalogue of plays to Methuen Drama, where many of them were republished, but not Krindlekrax. On 23 September 2016 Samuel French Ltd. announced on their Twitter page that 17 of Ridley's plays had been added to their catalogue to purchase performance rights to. Amongst the plays were Kridlekrax, the script of which has been republished by Samuel French in an "acting edition", after many years of being out of print.

Potential film adaptation

It was revealed in 2005 that Ridley was working on a film adaptation of Krindlekrax. In 2012 Ridley's agent, Knight Hall Agency Ltd, wrote on their website that "THE SUMMER OF 76 an adaptation of his own widely-acclaimed children's book KRINDLEKRAX is in development".

A potential film by Philip Ridley called The Summer Of '76 had previously been included as part of the line-up of the CineMart project market in 2003. CineMart is an event where film professionals can network and find "money for projects to be realized either through co-production or any other means" for films that are at various stages of development. The production company Kennedy Mellor Ltd were listed as being attached to the possible film. Development on this film might have begun as early as 2001 because in June 2001 money was charged between Kennedy Mellor Ltd and the Children's Film and Television Foundation Limited for "All the company's rights title and interest in the literary and artistic work by philip ridley entitled "krindlekrax" including: treatment and screenplays".

In late 2019 reference to the development of the film was removed from Ridley's page on the Knight Hall Agency website.

References

External links
 Krindlekrax listing on the Penguin publishing website
 Krindlekrax listing on the Healthy Books website

1991 children's books
British novels adapted into plays
British children's novels
English thriller novels
Jonathan Cape books
1991 British novels
Children's novels about animals
Fictional crocodilians